Konrad Öttinger (born Pforzheim, Germany; date and place of death unknown) was a Reformation era German Lutheran pastor, since 1530 domestic chaplain of Philip I, Landgrave of Hesse.

16th-century German Lutheran clergy
German male non-fiction writers